James Richards (born 1983) is a British artist who lives in Berlin and London. Born in Cardiff, he studied Fine Art at Chelsea College of Art & Design, London.

On 7 May 2014, it was announced that he was one of the four nominees for the Turner Prize. Richards was nominated for Rosebud, a 13-minute black and white video that includes video clips and photographs taken from erotic books in a Tokyo library, all of which have had the genitalia scratched out to comply with censorship laws.

References

External links
More Than A Feeling: An Interview with James Richards

1983 births
Artists from Cardiff
British video artists
Alumni of Chelsea College of Arts
Living people
English contemporary artists
Welsh contemporary artists